The Roubidoux Formation is a geologic formation in the Ozarks of Missouri and in Virginia. It preserves fossils dating back to the Ordovician period.

Paleofauna

Monoplacophora
 Kirengella
 K. oregonensis
 Wildernessia
 W. inexpectans

See also

 List of fossiliferous stratigraphic units in Missouri
 Paleontology in Missouri
 List of fossiliferous stratigraphic units in Virginia
 Paleontology in Virginia

References

 

Ordovician Missouri
Ordovician geology of Virginia
Ordovician System of North America
Geologic formations of Missouri
Geologic formations of Virginia
Landforms of the Ozarks
Ordovician southern paleotemperate deposits
Ordovician southern paleotropical deposits